Afalla Issen is a town and rural commune in Chichaoua Province of the Marrakech-Tensift-Al Haouz region of Morocco. At the time of the 2004 census, the commune had a total population of 6961 people living in 1523 households.

References

Populated places in Chichaoua Province
Rural communes of Marrakesh-Safi